An Atlas of Fantasy, compiled by Jeremiah Benjamin Post, was originally published in 1973 by Mirage Press and revised for a 1979 edition by Ballantine Books. The 1979 edition dropped twelve maps from the first edition and added fourteen new ones. It also included an introduction by Lester del Rey.

To remain of manageable size, the Atlas excludes advertising maps, cartograms, most disproportionate maps, and alternate history ("might have been") maps, focusing instead on imaginary lands derived from literary sources. It purposefully omits "one-to-one" maps such as Thomas Hardy's Wessex (which merely renames places in southwest England), but includes Barsetshire and Yoknapatawpha County, which are evidently considered to be sufficiently fictionalized. The emphasis is on science fiction and fantasy, though Post suggests there exist enough mystery fiction maps to someday create The Detectives' Handy Pocket Atlas. Other maps were omitted due to permission costs or reproduction quality.

The maps are reproduced from many sources, and an Index of Artists is included.

Reception
Stephen L. Lortz reviewed An Atlas of Fantasy for Different Worlds magazine and stated that "An Atlas of Fantasy has provided me with many hours of entertainment as well as a number of inspirations for my FRP campaign, and in my opinion, belongs on the reference shelf of every Game Master and fantasist."

Reviews
Review by William P. Hall Jr. (1974) in Cross Plains V1n4, July-August 1974
Review by Stuart David Schiff (1974) in Whispers #4, July 1974
Review by Greg Bear (1974) in Luna Monthly, #56, November 1974
Review by uncredited (1975) in Amra V2n63, April 1975
Review by David L. Greene (1975) in The Baum Bugle, Spring 1975
Review by Richard Mathews (1979) in Science Fiction & Fantasy Book Review, July 1979
Review by Lewis Pulsipher (1983) in Dragon Magazine, April 1983

See also
 The Dictionary of Imaginary Places
Literary Wonderlands

References

1973 books
1979 non-fiction books
Fantasy books
Fictional atlases